David Habarugira (born 16 August 1988 in Bujumbura) is a Burundian footballer who is playing for Léopold FC.

Career

Club
Habarugira grew up in Brussels, and began his career in 2002 playing in the youth system of storied Belgian club Anderlecht. He began his professional career in 2007 on loan to Union Saint-Gilloise, having been made being part of the team's EXQI League squad in the 2007-08 season. He played his first professional game on 22 September 2007 against Kortrijk.

Habarugira signed with Major League Soccer side D.C. United on 14 August 2009. He made appearances for the team in the CONCACAF Champions League. He was released by D.C. United on 20 January 2010.

International
Habarugira is a full international for the Burundi national football team. He made his first appearance for the team on 1 June 2008 in a 2010 FIFA World Cup qualifier against the Seychelles.

Personal life
David's brother, Jean-Paul Habarugira, is also a professional soccer player, for Atlético Olympic and the national side.

References

1988 births
Living people
Sportspeople from Bujumbura
Burundian footballers
Burundian expatriate footballers
Burundi international footballers
Burundian emigrants to Belgium
R.S.C. Anderlecht players
Royale Union Saint-Gilloise players
D.C. United players
R.W.D.M. Brussels F.C. players
Sint-Truidense V.V. players
Lierse S.K. players
FC Stade Lausanne Ouchy players
Léopold FC players
Challenger Pro League players
Swiss Promotion League players
Association football defenders
Burundian expatriate sportspeople in the United States
Burundian expatriate sportspeople in Switzerland
Expatriate soccer players in the United States
Expatriate footballers in Switzerland